"Bayan Ko" (usually translated as "My Country") is one of the most recognizable patriotic songs of the Philippines. It was written in Spanish by the Revolutionary general José Alejandrino in light of the Philippine–American War and subsequent American occupation, and translated into Tagalog some three decades later by the poet José Corazón de Jesús.

The song, which is a kundiman, is often considered the unofficial second national anthem of the Philippines, and is sometimes sung by Overseas Filipinos groups after the Lupang Hinirang or by itself. It is sometimes assumed to be a folk music because of its popularity, and due to the nature of its lyrics it has been used as a protest song by different political groups at various points in Philippine history.

History

Origin
The Spanish lyrics of Bayan Ko were originally written for the Severino Reyes zarzuela, Walang Sugat ("no wound"). Attributed to the propagandista, General José Alejandrino, the song expressed opposition to the ongoing American Occupation. The popular and mainly used 1929 Tagalog version is attributed to José Corazón de Jesús, and the music to Constancio de Guzmán.

Protest song during the Marcos dictatorship
Bayan Ko regained cult popularity during the Marcos dictatorship, with protesters singing their own version in protests. After President Marcos imposed Martial Law in 1972, the song was deemed seditious. Public performances of the song were banned, with violators facing potential arrest and detention. People were emboldened to sing it at the 1983 funeral of Senator Benigno Aquino Jr. and the ensuing 1986 People Power Revolution, where Freddie Aguilar led crowds in singing.

Post-EDSA People Power (1986–present)
Since the 1986 Revolution that toppled the Marcos government and ushered in the Fifth Republic, the song has been associated with anti-government protests. In February 1987, a cover by pop singer JoAnne Lorenzana was launched as part of a nationalistic campaign by PLDT, and was aired on radio and television for the first anniversary of the Revolution.

On 1 August 2009, Bayan Ko was sung as the recessional of the noon Mass at EDSA Shrine, ending the quarant'ore for Corazón Aquino. The service, originally intended to pray for the former leader's recovery, was instead done to mourn her sudden death early that morning. Crowds sang it again during the transfer of her remains from La Salle Green Hills to Manila Cathedral on 3 August for the lying in state. At the Requiem Mass on 5 August, Lea Salonga sang it as the recessional while Aquino's casket was borne out to the Cathedral steps. A military band repeated it as the flatbed hearse carrying the casket and honor guard began the hours-long funeral procession. Mourners sang Bayan Ko for the last time with several hymns as Aquino's casket was entombed beside her husband at the couple's mausoleum in Parañaque.

A month later, British all-male chorale group Libera sang Bayan Ko as an encore to their first Philippine tour in Cebu and Manila. Moved by the performance, the audience sporadically applauded throughout the group's performance. As part of their Summer Philippine tour the following year, Libera gave an encore performance on the hit noontime variety programme, Showtime on 14 April 2010.

The University of the Philippines Madrigal Singers sang Bayan Ko during the inauguration of President Benigno Aquino III and Vice-president Jejomar Binay on 30 June 2010 at the Quirino Grandstand.

In 2016, the song figured in nationwide protests in the aftermath of the burial of former Philippine President Ferdinand Marcos at the Libingan ng mga Bayani. The song has figured in nationwide protests against Philippine president Rodrigo Duterte in 2020.

Following the death of President Benigno Aquino III on 24 June 2021, Bayan Ko was sung by mourners and supporters as the urn containing the late president's ashes was buried beside his parents at their mausoleum at the Manila Memorial Park in Paranaque.

Lyrics

Lyrical variations
The modern Filipino lyrics based on the original Tagalog omit all diacritics and contract kaniyang to kanyang.

The lines Pag-ibig ang sa kaniyang palad // nag-alay ng ganda’t dilag has minor variations which subtly change the meaning, revolving around the concept of palad, literally "palm of the hand", but here closer to "fortune" or "fate" (cf. mapalad "fortunate", masamang palad "ill fortune", kapalaran "destiny", gulong ng palad "wheel of fortune").

Pag-ibig nasa kanyang palad, // Nag-alay ng ganda’t dilag as sung by Freddie Aguilar, may be rendered as "With love, as per her fate, she (the country) offered up her beauty and splendor".

Pag-ibig ko sa kanyang palad // nag-alay ng ganda’t dilag as sung by Asin and others, may be rendered as "My love, as per her fate, offered up beauty and splendor to her".

Asin also replaces makita kang sakdal laya "to see you absolutely free" with makita kang malaya "to see you free".

Arrangements
While largely unchanged from the De Guzmán arrangement, the song has renditions by different composers and singers, notably by Lucio D. San Pedro (National Artist for music), Asin, and Freddie Aguilar. Aguilar's cover is one of the most famous renditions of the song; an often overlooked detail is that the instrumental section of this version is Pilipinas Kong Mahal, another Filipino patriotic song. Asin's rendition included another de Jesús work, Kay Sarap Mabuhay Sa Sariling Bayan, as a preluding stanza to the main lyrics. Sung mostly by Leftist groups, the stanza is included as the bridge replacing Pilipinas Kong Mahal with the prelude of Ang Bayan kong Hirang.

On 7 November 1988, an a capella version by Josephine Roberto, featuring the cast of That's Entertainment, was used for Towering Power: A Musical Dedication, which was for the launching of GMA Network's 777-foot tower.

Allison Opaon sang a Japanese version in Yokohama on 18 November 2006, during a concert-rally against political killings in the Philippines.

This song has also been arranged by Robert Prizeman and sung by the vocal group Libera when touring the Philippines.

Domino de Pio Teodosio (with guitar) sang a special arrangement of Bayan Ko by Reginald Vince M. Espíritu (oboe) and Anjo Inacay (cello) at the John F. Kennedy School of Government on 7 March 2011. The performance, which was for visiting world leaders during the school's International Week, was organized by the Philippine Caucus of the Kennedy School.

In popular culture
In 1984, the song title was used for the movie Bayan Ko: Kapit sa Patalim directed by Lino Brocka. The song was censored from the film as one of the conditions for the film's release in the Philippines.
In 2013, the song was used for a series of the same title.

References

Asian anthems
Filipino patriotic songs
Tagalog-language songs